The 2008–09 OHL season was the 29th season of the Ontario Hockey League. Twenty teams played 68 games each during the regular season schedule, which started on September 17, 2008 and concluded on March 15, 2009. The OHL inaugurated the Mickey Renaud Captain's Trophy following his death in the previous season. The Windsor Spitfires played their last game at Windsor Arena on December 4, defeating the Guelph Storm, 2–1.  The Spitfires played their first game at the WFCU Centre on December 11 against the Belleville Bulls, losing the game 4–0. The playoffs began on March 18, 2009, and ended on May 8, 2009 with the Windsor Spitfires winning the J. Ross Robertson Cup, and a berth in the 2009 Memorial Cup which was held in Rimouski, Quebec. Windsor went on to win the Memorial Cup.

Regular season

Final standings
Note: DIV = Division; GP = Games played; W = Wins; L = Losses; OTL = Overtime losses; SL = Shootout losses; GF = Goals for; GA = Goals against; PTS = Points; x = clinched playoff berth; y = clinched division title; z = clinched conference title

Eastern conference

Western conference

Scoring leaders 
Note: GP = Games played; G = Goals; A = Assists; Pts = Points; PIM = Penalty minutes

Leading goaltenders 
Note: GP = Games played; Mins = Minutes played; W = Wins; L = Losses: OTL = Overtime losses; SL = Shootout losses; GA = Goals allowed; SO = Shutouts; SV% = Save percentage; GAA = Goals against average

Playoffs

Conference quarterfinals

Eastern conference

Western conference

Conference semifinals

Eastern conference

Western conference

Conference finals

J. Ross Robertson Cup

J. Ross Robertson Cup Champions Roster

Playoff scoring leaders 
Note: GP = Games played; G = Goals; A = Assists; Pts = Points; PIM = Penalty minutes

Playoff leading goaltenders 
Note: GP = Games played; Mins = Minutes played; W = Wins; L = Losses: OTL = Overtime losses; SL = Shootout losses; GA = Goals Allowed; SO = Shutouts; GAA = Goals against average

All-Star teams

First team
Cody Hodgson, Centre, Brampton Battalion
Taylor Hall, Left Wing, Windsor Spitfires
Bryan Cameron, Right Wing, Belleville Bulls
Ryan Ellis, Defence, Windsor Spitfires
P. K. Subban, Defence, Belleville Bulls
Mike Murphy, Goaltender, Belleville Bulls
Bob Boughner, Coach, Windsor Spitfires

Second team
John Tavares, Centre, London Knights
Justin DiBenedetto, Left Wing, Sarnia Sting
Greg Nemisz, Right Wing, Windsor Spitfires
Cameron Gaunce, Defence, Belleville Bulls
John Carlson, Defence, London Knights
Thomas McCollum, Goaltender, Brampton Battalion
George Burnett, Coach, Belleville Bulls

Third team
Chris Terry, Centre, Plymouth Whalers
Evgeny Grachev, Left Wing, Brampton Battalion
Matt Kennedy, Right Wing, Guelph Storm
Alex Pietrangelo, Defence, Niagara IceDogs
Michael Del Zotto, Defence, London Knights
Edward Pasquale, Goaltender, Saginaw Spirit
Mike Vellucci, Coach, Plymouth Whalers

All-Star Classic
The 2009 Subway OHL All-Star Classic was played February 4, 2009 at the WFCU Centre in Windsor, won 11–6 by the Eastern Conference.  Cody Hodgson of the Brampton Battalion won the player of the game award, as he scored three goals and added two assists. The skills competition was held the previous night on February 3, with the Western Conference winning.  Honorary captains for the event were former Peterborough Petes player Steve Yzerman for the Eastern Conference, while former Windsor Spitfires player Adam Graves represented the Western Conference.

Awards

2009 OHL Priority Selection
On May 2, 2009, the OHL conducted the 2009 Ontario Hockey League Priority Selection. The Sault Ste. Marie Greyhounds held the first overall pick in the draft, and selected Daniel Catenacci from the York-Simcoe Express. Catenacci was awarded the Jack Ferguson Award, awarded to the top pick in the draft.

Below are the players who were selected in the first round of the 2009 Ontario Hockey League Priority Selection.

2009 CHL Import Draft
On June 30, 2009, the Canadian Hockey League conducted the 2009 CHL Import Draft, in which teams in all three CHL leagues participate in. The Plymouth Whalers held the first pick in the draft by a team in the OHL, and selected Gabriel Landeskog from Sweden with their selection.

Below are the players who were selected in the first round by Ontario Hockey League teams in the 2009 CHL Import Draft.

2009 NHL Entry Draft
On June 26–27, 2009, the National Hockey League conducted the 2009 NHL Entry Draft held at the Bell Centre in Montreal, Quebec. In total, 45 players from the Ontario Hockey League were selected in the draft. John Tavares of the London Knights was the first player from the OHL to be selected, as he was taken with the first overall pick by the New York Islanders.

Below are the players selected from OHL teams at the NHL Entry Draft.

See also 
 2009 Memorial Cup
 List of OHL seasons
 2008–09 QMJHL season
 2008–09 WHL season
 2008 NHL Entry Draft
 List of OHA Junior A standings
 2008 in ice hockey
 2009 in ice hockey

References

External links 
 Official website of the Ontario Hockey League
 Official website of the Canadian Hockey League
 Official website of the MasterCard Memorial Cup
 Official website of the Home Hardware Top Prospects Game
 Official website of the ADT Canada Russia Challenge
 Official website of the OHL All-Star Classic

Ontario Hockey League seasons
OHL